"Women" is the fourth single taken from the third album, Head Games by the band, Foreigner. It was written by Mick Jones, and released in February 1980. The song's B-side, "The Modern Day" is also sung by its writer, Jones.

Reception
Billboard praised the "strong vocals and hot guitar licks" but criticized the womanizing lyrics.  Cash Box said that "slashing lead guitars...lead the way into the hardcore boogie beat, with Lou Gramm's rough 'n' tumble vocals, for another pop, AOR winner."  Record World said that the song "rocks hard with buzzsaw guitar and steamy vocals."  Rolling Stone critic David Fricke described it as a "presumably tongue-in-cheek misogynous chant" that is "powered by guitarist-songwriter Mick Jones' jackhammer riffing and Dennis Elliott's ham-fisted drumming" but "free of...pomp-art, heavy-metal flourishes."  St. Joseph News-Press critic Conrad Bibens identified "Women" as being a "departure from the band's style" and described the song as "a bluesy track similar to some of Steve Miller's recent works."

Daily Republican Register critic Mike Bishop called "Women" the "dumbest song" on Head Games, highlighting the lyrics "Women behind bars / Women in fast cars / Women in distress / Women in no dress."  Livingston County Daily Press and Argus critic Scott Pohl found the lyrics of the song to be chauvinistic and unattractive as a "tale of how awful things can get when you deal with women."  On the other hand, Democrat and Chronicle arts editor Jack Garner called "Women" the most interesting song on Head Games, despite its seemingly simple structure. Garner wrote that it:

Press-Enterprise critic Kim McNally used a similar verse to illustrate that the song's words have force, and was relieved that, unlike most other songs on Head Games, the lyrics to "Women" are not simply "you-me-ooh-baby-you."  She said that the music sounds like the Cars.  PopMatters critic Evan Sawdey said that "'Women' had a strut that was absent from past two Foreigner [albums]."  But News-Journal critic Ralph Kisiel said that the music "sounds like your baby brother took the needle of your stereo and scraped it across the record."

Responding to criticism of the song's lyrics, lead singer Lou Gramm said that the song uses female stereotypes in a way that "couldn't be more tongue-in-cheek."

Chart performance
"Women" reached No. 41 on the Billboard Hot 100.

Band reaction
Jones said of the song:
You know, it was supposed to be a fun song, tongue-in-cheek a little bit. But yeah, it’s one of the band’s favorite songs to play. Throughout all of the years, it always comes up, you know, the fans bring it up sometimes. There’s certainly a nice little strut to it.

References

1980 singles
Foreigner (band) songs
Songs written by Mick Jones (Foreigner)
Song recordings produced by Roy Thomas Baker
1979 songs
Atlantic Records singles
Song recordings produced by Mick Jones (Foreigner)
Song recordings produced by Ian McDonald (musician)